The Château de Richelieu was an enormous 17th-century château (manor house) built by the French clergyman, nobleman, and statesman Cardinal Richelieu (1585–1642) in Touraine. It was demolished for building materials in 1805 and almost nothing of it remains today. It lay south of Chinon and west of Sainte-Maure de Touraine, just south of what is now Richelieu, Indre-et-Loire, surrounded by mostly agricultural land.

Built between 1631 and 1642 on the site of the former du Plessis family mansion, the château was at the heart of a several-hectare park located south of the current city. The site was designated a historical monument in September 1930.

History
The château, along with a new model village ( "new town"), was built at the order of Richelieu, who had spent his youth there and bought the village of his ancestors; he had the estate raised to a duché-pairie in August 1631. He engaged the architect Jacques Lemercier, who had designed the Sorbonne and the Cardinal's hôtel in Paris, the Palais Cardinal (now the Palais-Royal). With the permission of King Louis XIII, Richelieu created from scratch a walled town on a grid plan and, enclosing within its precincts the modest home of his childhood, an adjacent palace (the Château de Richelieu proper) surrounded by an ornamental moat and large imposing walls enclosing a series of entrance courts towards the town and, on the opposite side, grand axially planned formal vista gardens of parterres and gravel walks, a central circular fountain, and views reaching to an exedra cut in the surrounding trees and pierced by an avenue in the woodlands extending to the horizon. The pleasure grounds were enclosed in woodland; since their innovative example was followed and extended at Vaux-le-Vicomte and in the gardens of Versailles, and since André Le Nôtre's father was employed at Richelieu in 1629, it is not improbable that the young boy was employed as well. Construction took place between 1631 and 1642 – the year of the Cardinal's death – and employed around 2,000 workers.

At the Château de Richelieu, the Cardinal maintained one of the largest art collections in Europe and the largest collection of ancient Roman sculpture in France.

After a period of decline, the Château de Richelieu was dismantled in the 19th century — not for any great political reasons, but by an estate agent. It was sold, stone for stone, as building material. Elements of the fabric appear to have been reused on farms in the area.

Description

The château

The grounds
The château was approached by a long double avenue of trees forming one of three avenues that met at a patte d'oie before the outer gates, which curved inwards to form half of a circle on the ground that was completed by the pattern formed by the three approaching approaches through the town; this nodal feature, with its flanking pavilions, survives, in the town's Place du Cardinal. In the two spandrel shapes enclosed behind the outer walling were matching enclosed outer service courts. Through the arched central gateway the visitor entered the vast basse cour, with common stabling for a hundred horses in a flanking courtyard to the left, with barns and lodgings for gardeners and estate workers, and to the right, an identical courtyard with elite stabling, bakehouse and other offices. Continuing along the axis one passed through a smaller cour d'honneur enclosed by matching ranges each with a central dome and end pavilions. There was a central fountain. Beyond was the rectangular moat that surrounded the château itself, with its inner court, reached across a central drawbridge leading to the grand domed gatehouse, a handsome structure with Hercules and Mars in niches on either side and a statue of Louis XIII above, with a statue of Fame crowning the dome.

The inner court was about two thirds the width of the avant-cour. The main corps de logis was domed; its left-hand range enclosed the modest house of Richelieu's youth. Wings enclosed the court on either side; once again they had end pavilions with squared domes. On the façades of the piano nobile there were niches in the piers between windows, containing statues, and niches in the ground floor containing busts.

The garden front looked onto a square parterre that was itself surrounded by moats and reached by a central bridge. Like the two outer courts, it was divided in four plats with a central feature. To either side a major cross-axis extended the patterned gardens. Ahead, at the terminus of the main axis, the woods drew back in an exedra.

The site today
The walled gardens of the château remain and are open as a public park. A few fragments of the palace buildings remain, such as the bridges over the moats, the "Honour Gateway", and some buildings from the service ranges; one of the latter is in use as a kind of museum or information centre and includes pictures and models of the palace as it once was. This building is covered in carved graffiti from visitors to the site, dating back at least as far as 1905, and including dated initials from the periods of both World War I and World War II, plus some graffiti from bearers of the Richelieu name.

There is a small shop and management office at the entrance, and a car park between that and the town.

Gallery

Historical images

Extant remnants

References

External links
 3D video reconstruction of the Château de Richelieu, Parts 1, 2, and 3.

1642 establishments in France
1805 disestablishments in France
Houses completed in 1642
Buildings and structures demolished in 1805
Richelieu
Richelieu
Richelieu
Richelieu
Richelieu
Ancien Régime French architecture
Cardinal Richelieu